Ballydown may refer to:
Ballydown, County Antrim, a townland in County Antrim, Northern Ireland
Ballydown, County Down, a townland in County Down, Northern Ireland